Rayat Shikshan Sanstha is an educational society based in Satara, Maharashtra, India. It operates 34 colleges in Paschim Maharashtra.

History 
In 1882, Jyotirao Phule made a demand for providing free education for all. The social reforms movement in the 19th century in Maharashtra  brought changes in the nice  systems. Schools in rural areas were started by the then princely states of Baroda and Mysore. Shahu, the ruler of Kolhapur State, even brought in the reservation system in education. Bhaurao Patil was influenced by these reforms and took to educating the children of rural Maharashtra. In October 1919, during the meeting of Satyashodhak Samaj at Kale, Patil decided to form Rayat Shikshan Sanstha. "Rayat" meaning "subjects" was also used mainly as "peasants class" by the then British government.

Patil started with providing hostel facilities in towns to children of rural areas and thus making it possible for them to take education. He then established schools, colleges and teacher's training institutes. In May 1959, when Patil died, the organization had 38 hostels, 578 non-governmental schools, 3 colleges and 6 teacher's training institutes.

Awards
 Dr. Ambedkar National Award (1994)

References

External links

Educational organisations in Maharashtra
Organizations established in 1924
1924 establishments in India